East Moriches is a former railroad station on the Montauk Branch of the Long Island Rail Road. It was located near Pine Street and Railroad Avenue in East Moriches, New York.

History
East Moriches station was originally built in 1897, and throughout much of its history has existed as a flag stop which has served more freight than passengers. The station agency closed in 1932, and burned on September 22, 1936. A second depot was built at some point as a brick structure, but continued to operate primarily as a freight station and a flag stop, as the original depot did. Despite efforts to keep this station open, as well as Brookhaven and Eastport stations, the New York State Public Service Commission gave the Long Island Rail Road permission to close them all on October 6, 1958. Commuters were advised by the Long Island Rail Road to use Center Moriches station instead. As of 2006, the former station still remains standing as a private residence. The Center Moriches station was closed in 1998, and had been only a sheltered platform in its last 13 years of existence.

References

External links
East Moriches Station (Arrt's Arrchives)
East Moriches Station History (TrainsAreFun)
PSC Decision Brings Up Colorful History of B'haven, E'port, EM Stations (Patchogue Advance; September 25, 1958)

Former Long Island Rail Road stations in Suffolk County, New York
Railway stations in the United States opened in 1897
Railway stations closed in 1958
1897 establishments in New York (state)
1958 disestablishments in New York (state)